In algebraic geometry, Monsky–Washnitzer cohomology is a p-adic cohomology theory defined for non-singular affine varieties over fields of positive characteristic p introduced by  and , who were motivated by the work  of . Its extension to more general varieties is called rigid cohomology.

References

  (letter to Atiyah, Oct. 14 1963)

Algebraic geometry
Cohomology theories
Homological algebra